Neklan is a Slavic given name. It is of an old Czech origin with several possible meanings, most probable being "not fighting". It's most famously found in a legend recorded in Chronica Boemorum, written by Cosmas of Prague.

It is also used as a surname.

Famous bearers 
Neklan, was the sixth of the seven Bohemian mythical princes
Nek, an Italian singer

External links 
Theatre Alfa
Durynk and Neklan
Neklan and Vlastislav

Masculine given names
Slavic masculine given names
Czech masculine given names